The 2011 Singapore League Cup will be held between 19 and 30 July.  The draw was held on Friday, 1 July 2011 in Singapore. The matches are played on a one match basis.

The Young Lions have opted out of participation in view of their impending involvement in the inaugural AFF Under-23 tournament in Indonesia during the period of the competition.

Scoreline
Number in  denotes the final score for penalty shootout.

Number in {} denotes the final score at extra time (AET)

Preliminary stage
The winners advance to the quarter-final stage.

Quarter-final stage

Semi-final stage

3rd-place playoff

Final

External links
 SLeague.Com: League Cup 2011 draw made with Etoile in absentia
 SLeague.com: League Cup 2011 Fixtures and Scores

See also
 S.League
 Singapore Cup
 Singapore Charity Shield
 Football Association of Singapore
 List of football clubs in Singapore

2011
League Cup
2011 domestic association football cups
July 2011 sports events in Asia